Maurice Clermont (March 11, 1944 in Laval, Quebec - February 10, 2022 in Sainte-Adèle, Quebec)  was a former Quebec politician. He was the Member of National Assembly of Quebec for the riding of Mille-Iles in the Laval region. He was a member of the Quebec Liberal Party.

Graduating from the Food Trade School, Clermont was for 23 years the owner of a local supermarket as well as a butcher. In 1986, he became an investment manager. He was also a city councillor for the Laval City Council for 20 years prior to his jump to provincial politics. He was the Leader of the Opposition for that city for 16 years. In addition, Clermont was a member of the Knights of Columbus and the Canadian Cancer Society.

Clermont was elected in 2003 in Mille-Iles and re-elected for a second term in 2007. Clermont was a backbench member for the Liberals.

Electoral record

Source: Official Results, Le Directeur général des élections du Québec.

Source: Official Results, Le Directeur général des élections du Québec.

External links
 

1944 births
Living people
Quebec Liberal Party MNAs
Laval, Quebec city councillors
21st-century Canadian politicians